Vol 1: The Aural Underground is the first album by Mammal, recorded live at The Evelyn Hotel in their home town of Melbourne on 2 February 2007. Released and sold on their album launch tour, the album was then released in stores six days later.

Track listing
"New Breed Judas" – 3:56
"Think" – 4:17
"Groove Junkie" – 6:48
"Two Soles" – 2:34
"Dionysian" – 4:08
"Push & Shove" – 5:37
"Maker" – 5:21
"Believe" – 4:21
"Inciting" – 4:00
"Hell hello Yeah" – 3:51

References

Mammal (band) albums
2007 live albums